Complanine is a quaternary ammonium compound  isolated from the marine fireworm Eurythoe complanata. It causes an inflammatory effect upon contact with the skin or mucous membranes.

Occurrence 
It was previously known that handling the fireworm caused it to release a chemical that induces inflammation of the skin of marine predators and mammals (including humans). Complanine was the first compound isolated from the fireworm which causes these effects. The chemical structure of Complanine was determined by spectroscopical methods and the absolute configuration was confirmed with a total synthesis.

It is presumed that this compound's function is to deter predators of the fireworm.

References 

Invertebrate toxins
Quaternary ammonium compounds
Carboxamides
Secondary alcohols